Skeletonema grethae is a species of diatom. Together with S. pseudocostatum, S. tropicum, and S. japonicum, it possesses external processes of its fultoportulae that have narrow tips which connect with those of sibling cells via fork-, knot-, or knuckle-like unions.

References

Further reading
Kooistra, Wiebe HCF, et al. "Global diversity and biogeography of Skeletonema species (Bacillariophyta)." Protist 159.2 (2008): 177-193.
Alverson, Andrew J., and Leanne Kolnick. "Intragenomic nucleotide polymorphism among small subunit (18s) rDNA paralogs in the diatom genus skeletonema (bacillariophyta) 1." Journal of phycology 41.6 (2005): 1248-1257.
Bergesch, Marli, Marines Garcia, and Clarisse Odebrecht. "DIVERSITY AND MORPHOLOGY OF SKELETONEMA SPECIES IN SOUTHERN BRAZIL, SOUTHWESTERN ATLANTIC OCEAN1." Journal of phycology 45.6 (2009): 1348-1352.

External links

AlgaeBase

Protists described in 2005
Thalassiosirales